Brunnsåkersskolan is an elementary school in Halmstad, Sweden. It was founded in 1908

References

Schools in Sweden
Halmstad